John Damiano Komba (18 March 1954 – 28 February 2015) was a Tanzanian CCM politician and a retired officer of the Tanzanian army. He served as the Member of Parliament for Mbinga West constituency from 2005 until his death.

References

External links
 Mbinga West MP Komba is no more, Daily News

1954 births
2015 deaths
Chama Cha Mapinduzi MPs
Tanzanian MPs 2010–2015
Songea Boys Secondary School alumni
Tanzania Military Academy alumni
Tanzanian schoolteachers